The titan beetle (Titanus giganteus) is a Neotropical longhorn beetle, the sole species in the genus Titanus, and one of the largest known beetles.

Description
As such, the body of the Titan beetle is considerably larger than that of the Hercules beetles. The short, curved and sharp mandibles are known to snap pencils in half and cut into human flesh. Adult titan beetles do not feed, searching instead for mates via pheromones while in flight.

The larvae have never been found, but are thought to feed inside wood and may take several years to reach full size before they pupate. These beetles are also thought to feed on decaying wood below the ground. Boreholes thought to be created by titan beetle larvae seem to fit a grub over two inches wide and perhaps as much as one foot long. A famous "life-sized" photograph of a putative larva of this beetle appeared in National Geographic magazine, filling an entire page, but it turned out to be of a different species of beetle, possibly Macrodontia cervicornis.

The adults defend themselves by hissing in warning and biting, and have sharp spines, as well as strong jaws. The adult beetles central nervous system structure shown that the cephalic ganglion is composed of the central brain and optic lobes that connect to the sub esophageal ganglion (SOG).  This is a common structure for diurnal insects. The size of the size sensory integration were larger complex eyes that have structured large optic and antennal lobes.

Distribution
It is known from the rain forests of Venezuela, Colombia, Ecuador, Peru, the Guianas, and north-central Brazil.

Gallery

See also
 List of largest insects

References

External links

 Titanus giganteus pictures at Bio-Foto.com
 Video clip of the Titan beetle from Life in the Undergrowth
 Giant beetle visits Oxford University
 BBC news article with photograph
 BBC article which covers the beetle's grubs
 Natural History Museum page about Titanus giganteus
https://www.kidsdiscover.com/quick-reads/34551/

Prioninae
Beetles described in 1771
Beetles of South America
Arthropods of Colombia
Arthropods of South America
Fauna of French Guiana
Taxa named by Carl Linnaeus